A by-election was held for the New South Wales Legislative Assembly electorate of East Macquarie on 26 August 1867 because of the resignation of David Buchanan to return to Scotland.

Dates

Result

The by-election was caused by the resignation of David Buchanan.

See also
Electoral results for the district of East Macquarie
List of New South Wales state by-elections

References

1867 elections in Australia
New South Wales state by-elections
1860s in New South Wales